The Taipei Municipal Stadium is a multi-purpose stadium in Taipei, Taiwan. The original stadium, built in 1956, was used mostly for track and field events. Entertainer Michael Jackson performed two concerts there during his Dangerous World Tour on 4 and 6 September 1993 in front of a crowd of 80,000.

The stadium was demolished and reconstructed for the 2009 Summer Deaflympics between December 2006 and July 2009. The new stadium is able to hold 20,000 people. On 3 July 2011, the stadium recorded its highest attendance for a football game when Chinese Taipei hosted Malaysia in the 2014 FIFA World Cup qualification - AFC First Round second leg match, when 15,335 spectators attended the game. In 2013, 500 people showed up at the stadium for a domestic league match between association football clubs Taipower FC and Tatung FC.

The stadium is accessible from the Taipei Arena station of the Taipei Metro.

International Matches

See also
 List of stadiums in Taiwan

References

Sports venues in Taipei
Football venues in Taiwan
Athletics (track and field) venues in Taiwan
Multi-purpose stadiums in Taiwan
Sports venues completed in 2009